Michael Sleavon VC (1826 in Magheraculmoney, County Fermanagh – 15 August 1902, in Dromard, County Sligo) was an Irish recipient of the Victoria Cross.

Details
At the age of 31, Sleavon was a corporal in the Corps of Royal Engineers during the Indian Mutiny. On 3 April 1858 at Jhansi, India, his actions led to the award of the Victoria Cross:

Further information
He died in Dromard, County Sligo on 15 August 1902 and was buried in Bannagh Roman Catholic Churchyard, Tubrid, County Fermanagh.

References

Listed in order of publication year 
The Register of the Victoria Cross (1981, 1988 and 1997)

Ireland's VCs  (Dept of Economic Development, 1995)
The Sapper VCs (Gerald Napier, 1998)
Monuments to Courage (David Harvey, 1999)
Irish Winners of the Victoria Cross (Richard Doherty & David Truesdale, 2000)

External links
Royal Engineers Museum Sappers VCs
Location of grave and VC medal (Co. Fermanagh, Northern Ireland)

1826 births
1902 deaths
19th-century Irish people
Irish soldiers in the British Army
Royal Engineers soldiers
Irish recipients of the Victoria Cross
People from County Fermanagh
Indian Rebellion of 1857 recipients of the Victoria Cross
British Army recipients of the Victoria Cross
Military personnel from County Fermanagh